James Conner may refer to:

James Perry Conner (1851–1924), U.S. Representative from Iowa
James Conner (general) (1829–1883), Confederate general in the American Civil War
James Conner (American football) (born 1995), American football player

See also
James Connor (disambiguation)
James Connors (disambiguation)
James O'Connor (disambiguation)
Jimmy Connor (disambiguation)
Connor James (disambiguation)